The 2014–15 UMass Minutewomen basketball team will represent the University of Massachusetts Amherst  during the 2014–15 college basketball season. Sharon Dawley assumes the responsibility as head coach for her fifth season. The Minutewomen were members of the Atlantic 10 Conference and play their home games at the William D. Mullins Memorial Center. They finished the season 12–18, 5–11 in A-10 play to finish in a four way tie for tenth place. They advanced to the second round of the A-10 women's tournament where they lost to Richmond.

2014–15 media
All non-televised Minutewomen home games and conference road games will stream on the A-10 Digital Network. WMUA will carry Minutewomen games with Cody Chrusciel on the call.

2014–15 Roster

Schedule

|-
!colspan=9 style="background:#881c1c; color:#FFFFFF;"| Non-conference regular season

|-
!colspan=9 style="background:#881c1c; color:#FFFFFF;"| Atlantic 10 regular season

|-
!colspan=9 style="background:#881c1c; color:#FFFFFF;"| Atlantic 10 Tournament

Rankings
2014–15 NCAA Division I women's basketball rankings

See also
 2014–15 UMass Minutemen basketball team

References

UMass Minutewomen basketball seasons
UMass